Kishorpura is a village in Chirawa tehsil of Jhunjhunu district, Rajasthan, India.

Villages in Jhunjhunu district